This list of web awards is an index to articles on notable awards related to the internet.

List

See also

 Lists of awards
 List of computer-related awards
 List of webcomic awards
 List of media awards#Blog and podcasting

References